Crossroads of the World is an open-air mall on Sunset Boulevard and Las Palmas in Los Angeles. The mall features a central building designed to resemble an ocean liner surrounded by a small village of cottage-style bungalows. It was designed by Robert V. Derrah, built in 1936, and has been called America's first outdoor shopping mall.

Once a busy shopping center, the Crossroads later became private offices, primarily for the entertainment industry with a variety of music publishers and producers, television and film script writers, film and recording companies, novelists, costume designers, publicists, and casting agencies. The owner is planning a new development surrounding the site.

History
In 1931, after Charles H. Crawford's death, his wife Ella decided to build a multi-national outdoor market - that would feel like «a permanent world's fair with a cosmopolitan atmosphere» - on the land where her husband was shot. She hired the Streamline Moderne architect Robert V. Derrah (who was finishing his work on the Coca-Cola Building) to design the complex.

Derrah designed a ship-shaped structure in the center of the complex. The surrounding buildings represented different countries of the world. The complex originally held 57 shops and cafes, and 36 offices on the upper floors. The Crossroads of the World was inaugurated on October 29, 1936. The new shopping center was not a full-blown success, but it became an excellent model for outdoors malls across the world.

In the 1950s, the Crossroads of the World was converted into an office complex. The Screen Actors Guild, Crosby, Stills, Nash & Young, Jackson Browne and Alfred Hitchcock used to rent offices there. The property was purchased in 1977 by the real estate investor Mort La Kretz and restored. On June 1, 1985, Michael Perricone founded Interlock Studios, an audio post production facility, which was located in Bungalow 1522 of the complex, until 1998, when it relocated to 6520 Sunset Boulevard, and was sold to Rick Larson a few years later, who renamed it Larson Studios.

In January 2019, the Los Angeles City Council approved the project to revamp the Crossroads of the World in a move to revitalize the district. Preservationists called the redevelopment project a "Manhattanization of Hollywood". Eighty-two Hollywood Regency garden apartments are to be demolished in the project. These rent stabilized apartments are occupied by a decades-old, tight-knit community of largely low-income, predominantly Latino residents. Over 100 apartments in the project will be set aside for very low-income families.

In popular culture
Films:
L.A. Confidential
Indecent Proposal
The Adventures of Ford Fairlane
Café Society
Nancy Drew
Argo
TV shows
Dragnet
Remington Steele
Tenspeed and Brown Shoe
Bosch
Commercials:
McDonald's
Ford
Mattel
Music Video:
Big Audio Dynamite The Globe (album) The Globe (song)
The Xx I See You (album) I Dare You (song)
Video Game:

 Midnight Club: Los Angeles
 L.A. Noire

Reproductions
A reproduction of Crossroads' iconic tower and spinning globe can be seen just inside the entrance to Disney's Hollywood Studios at Walt Disney World in Florida.

See also
 Los Angeles Historic-Cultural Monuments in Hollywood
 List of Registered Historic Places in Los Angeles

References

External links
Official website

Buildings and structures in Hollywood, Los Angeles
Commercial buildings in Los Angeles
Shopping malls in Central Los Angeles
Pedestrian malls in the United States
Sunset Boulevard (Los Angeles)
Los Angeles Historic-Cultural Monuments
Commercial buildings on the National Register of Historic Places in Los Angeles
Historic districts in Los Angeles
Historic districts on the National Register of Historic Places in California
History of Los Angeles
Tourist attractions in Los Angeles
Art Deco architecture in California